A total lunar eclipse took place on Tuesday, July 16, 1935. It was a central eclipse, passing through the darkest part of the shadow.

Visibility

Related lunar eclipses
It is part of Saros series 128

Saros series 

Lunar Saros 128 contains 15 total lunar eclipses between 1845 and 2097 (in years 1845, 1863, 1881, 1899, 1917, 1935, 1953, 1971, 1989, 2007, 2025, 2043, 2061, 2079 and 2097). Solar Saros 135 interleaves with this lunar saros with an event occurring every 9 years 5 days alternating between each saros series.

Half-Saros cycle
A lunar eclipse will be preceded and followed by solar eclipses by 9 years and 5.5 days (a half saros). This lunar eclipse is related to two annular solar eclipses of Solar Saros 135.

See also
List of lunar eclipses
List of 20th-century lunar eclipses

Notes

External links

1935-07
1935 in science
Central total lunar eclipses